Sprinter New Generation or SNG: The Sprinter New Generation (abbreviated SNG) is an electrically driven type of trainset of the Dutch Railways or Nederlandse Spoorwegen. The trains are designed and built by the Spanish train builder Construcciones y Auxiliar de Ferrocarriles (CAF), who bases the trains on the Civity platform. The trains are primarily intended to replace older train equipment (primarily the Urban Regional Material (NS SGMm)), but are also intended for the growth of the number of passengers on the Hoofdrailnet or main rail network.

The Sprinter New Generation is characterized by a spacious interior, with much light and space. This is achieved through the use of Jacobs bogies, resulting in wide-body and spacious transitions. The low floor makes the train easier to access for the disabled.

History

Origins
In 1983 the first plans were made for the replacement of NS Mat '64 or Materieel '64 EMUs. The intention was to have a large series of slow trains in service from the early 1990s, which would replace the Materiel '64 at once. The series became known as the Stoptreinmaterieel '90 (SM '90). From 1992, train builder Talbot built a small test series of nine train sets, as a prelude to a large series of around 250 two and three-car sets. The test series was equipped with new technologies for that time, such as computer-controlled control and diagnosis systems. However, these techniques proved to be less reliable than anticipated, and therefore a large follow-up order was omitted. The series was taken out of service at the end of 2005.

Because there was a need for new equipment to replace the Materieel '64, in 2005 NS placed an order for 35 trainsets of the Sprinter Lighttrain type. These sets are based on the German DBAG Class 425, but have been adapted for use on the Dutch rail network. After placing follow-up orders in 2007 and 2009, there were 121 ordered train sets. It turned out that these couples did not fully meet the wishes of the Dutch Railways, as in the initial phase the train proved unable to withstand wintry weather. Travelers and traveler organizations also complained about the lack of toilets on board. Because of these points, further follow-up orders were cancelled, and the last train set was delivered in 2012.

The Sprinter Lighttrain has replaced the four-part train sets of Materiel '64, Plan T; they went out of service between 2008 and 2010. Due to the absence of further follow-up orders, it was not yet possible to replace part of the remaining two-part trainsets of the Materiel '64, the Plan V.

In addition to the lack of additional equipment to replace the Materieel '64 , a number of issues began to play a role in the demand for new train equipment around 2013: the high passenger growth and the inevitable replacement of the Stadsgewestelijk Materieel or NS SGMm, the first generation of Sprinters. The number of travelers on the hoofdrailnet (main network) grew by 24% from 2004 to 2013. This growth can largely be explained by an increase in population, a larger number of students, the increase in fuel prices and the running of extra trains. Because students, like commuters, travel especially during rush hour, the demand for transport, and therefore the demand for rolling stock, is greater during rush hours.

After a thorough renovation was conducted from 2003 to 2009, plans for the replacement of the Stadsgewestelijk Materieel were started at the end of the 2000s. This equipment was put into service between 1975 and 1983, so the first sets were forty years old in 2015. Because the technical lifespan of railway equipment is on average 40 years, they needed to be replaced. Therefore, NS placed an urgent order for 58 Stadler FLIRT trains in 2015 as a stopgap measure until the SNG trains could be fully introduced from December 2018.

Interior design process
Between 13 and 20 March 2015, NS gave travelers and staff the opportunity to choose possible interiors. Thanks to a test set-up at Rotterdam Central, interested parties were able to choose from three interiors, with seats for the first and second class and folding seats. The results have been an important factor for the interior choices for the new Sprinters.

At the end of September 2015, representatives of interest groups such as the Public Transport Travelers Association were given the opportunity to view a model of the new Sprinter New Generation in Spain. NS appeared to have chosen interior C from the experiment, with Sophia seats from the Spanish Fainsa and purple folding seats.

See also
Trains in the Netherlands
NS Sprinter Lighttrain
NS SGMm
NS VIRM
NS Intercity Materieel
NS DD-AR
NS Class 1700
Stadler FLIRT
Stadler GTW

References

Electric multiple units of the Netherlands
Nederlandse Spoorwegen